Nathan-Dylan Saliba (born February 7, 2004) is a Canadian professional soccer player who plays for Major League Soccer club CF Montréal.

Early life
Saliba began playing youth soccer at age nine with CS Longueuil. In 2017, he joined the Montreal Impact Academy. He is of Haitian descent through both his parents, and can speak English, French and Haitian Creole.

Club career
In December 2020, he signed his first professional contract with the Montreal Impact (later re-named CF Montreal) of Major League Soccer. He served as an unused substitute in their CONCACAF Champions League match against C.D. Olimpia on December 15, 2020. In 2022, he played with CF Montréal U23 in the Première ligue de soccer du Québec, scoring four goals in seven appearances. In December 2022, he signed a two-year extension with Montreal. During the 2023 pre-season, he sought to earn a spot with the first team squad, rather than to pursue a loan to the Canadian Premier League, as other Montreal young players had gone on in previous seasons and he scored a goal against the PLSQ All-Stars in a pre-season exhibition match. He made his professional debut on February 25, 2023, starting the season opener against Inter Miami CF.

International career
In 2016, he represented Canada at the Danone Nations Cup.

In 2019, he made his debut in the Canadian youth program at a camp with the Canada U15 team, after which he was named to the roster for the 2019 CONCACAF Boys' Under-15 Championship.

In 2022, he was named to the provisional roster for the Canada U20 team ahead of the 2022 CONCACAF U-20 Championship, although he was not named to the final roster.

Notes

References

External links

Living people
2004 births
Canadian soccer players
Canada men's youth international soccer players
Canadian people of Haitian descent
CS Longueuil players
CF Montréal players
Montreal Impact U23 players
Première ligue de soccer du Québec players
Major League Soccer players
Homegrown Players (MLS)
Association football midfielders